The Charity Commission for England and Wales is a non-ministerial department of His Majesty's Government that regulates registered charities in England and Wales and maintains the Central Register of Charities. Since the 2000s, governance of charities in the United Kingdom has been devolved; operating in other parts of the country are the Office of the Scottish Charity Regulator (since 2003) and the Charity Commission for Northern Ireland (since 2008).

The Charities Act 2006 requires the Commission to be operationally independent from ministerial influence or control. Members of the commission, including the chair, are appointed by the Secretary of State for Digital, Culture, Media and Sport.

Orlando Fraser, was appointed as Chair of the Charity Commission by the Secretary of State on a three year term commencing from 25th April 2022.  This appointment was not without controversy, including the refusal of the Digital, Culture, Media and Sports Committee to endorse the appointment 

Orlando Fraser succeeds interim chair, Ian Karet, who succeeded Baroness Stowell of Beeston. 

The commission has four sites in London, Taunton, Liverpool and Newport. Its website lists the latest accounts submitted by charities in England and Wales.

To March 2019, the Commission regulated £79 billion of charity income.

Exempt, excepted, and other non-registered charities
Some charities are not subject to regulation by or registration with the Charity Commission, because they are already regulated by another body, and are known as exempt charities. Most exempt charities are listed in Schedule 3 to the Charities Act 2011, but some charities are made exempt by other acts. However exempt charities must still comply with charity law and may approach the Charity Commission for advice.

Some charities are 'excepted' from charity registration. This means they do not have to register or submit annual returns, but are in all other respects subject to regulation by the Charity Commission. A charity is excepted if its income is £100,000 or less and it is in one of the following groups: churches and chapels belonging to certain Christian denominations (until 2031); charities that provide premises for some types of schools; Scout and Guide groups;  charitable service funds of the armed forces; and students' unions.

In addition, if a charity's income is below the normal threshold for registration (£5,000), then it is not required to be registered with the Charity Commission. Nevertheless, it remains subject to regulation by the Charity Commission in all other respects.

Charities operating across other national borders within the United Kingdom
Registration of a charity in England and Wales does not endow that status elsewhere, thus further registration has to be made before operating in Scotland or Northern Ireland.

Charities in Scotland are regulated by the Office of the Scottish Charity Regulator.

In Northern Ireland the Charity Commission for Northern Ireland was established in 2009 to replace earlier regulation by the Voluntary and Community Unit of the Department for Social Development, part of the Northern Ireland Executive.

Regulatory action
The commission carries out general monitoring of charities as part of its regular casework. It also has powers set out in the Charities Acts to conduct statutory investigations. However, opening a full statutory inquiry into a charity has a detrimental effect on the relationship with the regulator and can frustrate the intention to achieve a positive outcome. The commission, therefore, began around 2007 to carry out an intermediate form of action described as regulatory compliance investigations. In 2010 it opened over 140 of these cases, compared to just three full statutory investigations. However, the legality of these actions was debatable as they lacked a statutory basis. A high-profile example was the commission's report into The Atlantic Bridge, after which that body was dissolved in September 2011. The commission announced in October 2011, in the context of cost-cutting and a re-focussing of its activities, that it would no longer carry out regulatory compliance investigations.

In 2012, the Commission refused to grant charitable status to Plymouth Brethren Christian Church, stating that it was unclear whether the body's aims were compatible with the requirement for charities to have a public benefit. The Commission stated that this was called into doubt as a result of the "exclusivity" of the body. The decision was discussed at a session of the Public Accounts Committee, during which MP Charlie Elphicke accused the Commission of being "committed to the suppression of religion". The decision was later reversed by the Commission.

Between 2018-19, the Commission removed 4812 charities from the register and concluded 2473 regulatory compliance cases.

History

Prior to the 1840s, a body of Commissioners had been established by the Statue of Charitable Uses 1601, but these proved ineffective. The Charity Commission was first established by the Charitable Trusts Act 1853. There had been several attempts at reforming charities before that which had been opposed by various interest groups including  the church, the courts, the companies, and the universities. The power of the commission was strengthened by amendments to the act in 1855, 1860, and 1862.

The Charity Commission was substantially reconstituted by the Charities Act 1960, which replaced the Charitable Trusts Acts (1853-1891). This introduced new duties to determine charitable status, and to maintain a public register of charities.

The Charities Act 2006 established its current structure and name.  the commission had 288 employees and 19 agency staff in post.

In 2021, The Guardian reported that Culture Secretary Oliver Dowden "had instructed officials to ensure candidates for the Charity Commission chair role were “tested” on how they would use the watchdog’s powers to rebalance charities by “refocusing” them on their founding missions", in response to what he described as "a worrying trend in some charities that appear to have been hijacked by a vocal minority seeking to burnish their woke credentials."

Charity tax law
The Finance Act 2010 extended charitable tax benefits (for example Gift Aid) to charities within EU member states, Norway and Iceland, rather than those just inside the UK.

Criticism
The commission was criticised after the Aberfan disaster in 1966 for its intransigence and decisions on what it allowed money from the disaster fund to be spent on.  It sanctioned the use of £150,000 to remove remaining spoil tips from the area after the National Coal Board refused to pay for the work.  It also proposed asking parents ‘exactly how close were you to your child?’; those found not to have been close to their children would not be compensated.

Chairs of the commission
Chief Charity Commissioner
Prior to restructuring in 2006, the equivalent of chair was the Chief Charity Commissioner.
 Rt Hon Peter Erle (1853- )
 Seymour Vesey-FitzGerald (1875- )
 Sir Henry Longley (–1900)
 Charles Henry Alderson (5 March 1900–?)
 Richard Fries (1992-1999)
 John Stoker (1999–2004)
 Geraldine Peacock (2004–2006), latterly acting Chair

Chair of the Charity Commission
From 2006 the role of Chief Charity Commissioner was replaced with those of Chair and Chief Executive of the Charity Commission
 Dame Suzi Leather (1 August 2006 – 31 July 2012)
 William Shawcross (1 August 2012 – 23 February 2018)
 Baroness Stowell of Beeston (24 February 2018 – 23 February 2021)
 Ian Karet (24 February 2021 – 25 April 2022) - interim, term initially until 27 December 2021, extended until 25 April 2022.
 Orlando Fraser KC (25 April 2022 -) - appointed for a three-year term, thought he was rejected by the Digital, Culture, Media and Sport Committee per concerns about the selection process.

See also

 GuideStar – UK and US databases and information on charities
 Intelligent Giving – independent guide to UK charities

References

External links
 Official website

2007 establishments in England
2007 establishments in Wales
 
Charity regulators
Government bodies based in London
Non-ministerial departments of the Government of the United Kingdom
Organisations based in the City of Westminster
Organizations established in 2007
Regulators of England
Regulators of Wales